Aechmea moorei is a plant species in the genus Aechmea. This species is native to Ecuador and Peru.

Cultivars
 Aechmea 'Jack'
 Aechmea 'Peggy Joe'

References

BSI Cultivar Registry Retrieved 11 October 2009
Tropicos Retrieved 25 September 2010

moorei
Flora of Ecuador
Flora of Peru